Gabriel Kahane (born July 10, 1981) is an American composer and singer-songwriter.

Early life and education
Born in Venice Beach, California, Kahane is the son of a psychologist mother and the concert pianist Jeffrey Kahane. He attended the New England Conservatory before transferring to Brown University, where he wrote his first musical and graduated with a bachelor's degree in music.

Career

Songwriting 
Kahane's style is often compared to Sufjan Stevens and Rufus Wainwright and has collaborated with both of these artists.

Kahane released a self-titled album, Gabriel Kahane, on Family Records in 2008, receiving positive reviews.

In September 2011, Kahane released his second singer-songwriter album, Where Are The Arms, on StorySound Records. It was recorded with many of his regular collaborators, including Rob Moose on violin and guitar, Matt Johnson on drums, and Casey Foubert, who also helped mix and produce it, on various instruments. These three musicians would also collaborate with him on his next album, The Ambassador.

For his 2014 album, The Ambassador, he used ten addresses in L.A. to write songs from the perspectives of characters both real and imaginary. The album was featured in Rolling Stone, Vogue, and Paste, and Kahane also wrote a piece about exploring L.A. through music for The New Yorker. The album was staged by Tony-award winner John Tiffany with set design by Tony-award winner Christine Jones at the Brooklyn Academy of Music and Carolina Performing Arts in the fall of 2014 and at University of California, Los Angeles in the spring of 2015. The song "Empire Liquor Mart (9127 S. Figueroa St.)" from The Ambassador was selected by NPR as one of their NPR Music's Favorite Songs of 2014.

After the 2016 election, he embarked on a cross-country train trip that yielded the 2018 album Book of Travelers.

Composing and performance
Kahane's best-known work, the song cycle Craigslistlieder, which was his first concert work and was re-released by indie record label Family Records in 2008, sets real Craigslist ads to music. Other artists have covered this voice-and-piano piece, and Audra McDonald has included Craigslistlieder in her standard repertoire.

Kahane performed regularly at Rockwood Music Hall, where he had artistic residencies beginning as early as 2009. 

In the spring of 2010, Gabriel Kahane performed as part of the American Songbook at Lincoln Center, garnering praise from the New York Times. During the 2010–11 season, he performed with cellist Alisa Weilerstein in a duo recital featuring music composed by Kahane, including Little Sleep's Head Sprouting Hair in the Moonlight. After writing a piano concerto for Natasha Paremski, he was commissioned by the Kronos Quartet to write The Red Book, a string quartet based on Anne Carson's Autobiography of Red, and by the Los Angeles Philharmonic for a large chamber work. Crane Palimpsest, a work about the Brooklyn Bridge, was conducted by Kahane's father, Jeffrey Kahane, conducting the Los Angeles Chamber Orchestra.

As part of his 2012–2013 residency with the Orpheus Chamber Orchestra, Kahane wrote Gabriel's Guide to the 48 States inspired by the American Guide Series, commissioned by the government during the Great Depression. The piece received its New York Premiere at Carnegie Hall in April 2013 with Orpheus playing and Kahane singing.

Other notable compositions include Come On All You Ghosts, a three-part song cycle setting Matthew Zapruder's poetry for a baritone and string quartet, and he frequently performs and records with such artists as Timo Andres, Brooklyn Rider, Rob Moose,
Punch Brothers, and Chris Thile.
In August 2019 he was appointed Creative Chair of the Oregon Symphony in Portland, Oregon.

Musical theater
Gabriel Kahane began to work in theater in New York City after winning a Kennedy Center American College Theater Festival Award for Straight Man, which he wrote in college. He worked with New York theater company Les Freres Corbusier, music directing A Very Merry Unauthorized Children's Scientology Pageant and the LA production of Bloody Bloody Andrew Jackson for Michael Friedman and Alex Timbers.

His musical February House, commissioned by The Public Theater, told the story of a Brooklyn World War II-era commune, where W.H. Auden, Gypsy Rose Lee, Benjamin Britten, Peter Pears, Carson McCullers, Jane Bowles, and Paul Bowles all lived together.

His album The Ambassador was staged at Brooklyn Academy of Music (BAM) in 2014–2015 by Tony-award winner John Tiffany with set design by Tony-award winner Christine Jones.  In 2017, Kahane returned to BAM to present a multi-media solo concert of his album Book of Travelers, directed by Tony-award winner Daniel Fish.

Kahane has been commissioned by the Signature Theatre (Arlington, Virginia) and The Public Theater in New York City and is currently under commission for new pieces for both theaters.

Personal life 
Kahane spent much of his career in Brooklyn, New York City.  In March, 2020, Kahane moved to Portland, Oregon.  He currently performs his original songs in venues across the United States.

An accomplished scholastic chess player, Gabriel achieved the title of “Expert” at age 14.

Works

ORCHESTRA:

 2016 Nocturama —large orchestra, commissioned by the Interlochen Academy for the Arts
 2015 Freight & Salvage —string orchestra, commissioned by A Far Cry, The Knights, and the Orlando Philharmonic
 2013 Gabriel’s Guide to the 48 States—baritone, electric guitar, banjo, and chamber orchestra, commissioned by Orpheus Chamber Orchestra
 2012 Crane Palimpsest—baritone and chamber orchestra, co-commissioned by the American Composers Orchestra and the Los Angeles Chamber Orchestra

LARGE ENSEMBLE:

 2011 Orinoco Sketches—piano, baritone, guitar, and large chamber ensemble, commissioned by the Los Angeles Philharmonic

CHAMBER:

 2014 Bradbury Studies—string quartet, commissioned by the Los Angeles Chamber Orchestra
 2013 Without a Frame—flute, bass clarinet, trumpet, electric or acoustic guitar, viola, and cello, written for yMusic
 2012 Fun House—flute doubling piccolo, Bb clarinet doubling bass clarinet, Bb trumpet doubling piccolo trumpet and chromatic harmonica, violin doubling electric guitar, viola, and cello, written for yMusic
 2012 The Fiction Issue—string quartet, piano, reed organ, two guitars, and two solo voices (one male/one female), commissioned by Carnegie Hall for Brooklyn Rider, Shara Worden, and the composer
 2012 Line Up!—string quartet, commissioned by Caramoor International Music Festival for the Linden Quartet
 2011 Come On All You Ghosts—string quartet and baritone, commissioned by Bravo! Vail for the Calder Quartet
 2010 Little Sleep's Head Sprouting Hair in the Moonlight—cello, piano, and baritone, commissioned by Linda and Stuart Nelson
 2010 The Red Book—string quartet, commissioned by the Kronos Quartet
 2009 Pocket Concerto—solo trumpet, flute, clarinet, and string trio (w/ violin doubling electric guitar), commissioned by Linda and Stuart Nelson
 2008 For the Union Dead—flute, clarinet (doubling bass clarinet), trumpet, banjo, piano, voice, and string trio (violin doubling electric guitar), commissioned by the Verbier Festival

KEYBOARD:

 2016 Works on Paper—piano, commissioned by Carnegie Hall for Timo Andres
 2011 Being Alive (after Stephen Sondheim)—piano, commissioned by Anthony De Mare
 2011 The Baffled King (after Leonard Cohen)—piano, commissioned by the Ecstatic Music Festival
 2009 Django: Tiny Variations on a Big Dog—piano, commissioned by Jeffrey Kahane
 2008 Sonata—piano, commissioned by Linda and Stuart Nelson

VOCAL:

 2015 Sorkin Rants—voice and piano
 2013 Three Vernacular Songs—voice and piano
 2011 The Memory Palace—baritone and piano, commissioned by New York Festival of Song
 2006 Craigslistlieder—voice and piano

MISCELLANEOUS:

 2010 Étude: Cobalt Cure—solo violin, commissioned by Festival Vestfold

THEATER WORKS:

 2012 February House—two acts, ensemble cast, commissioned by The Public Theater
 2007 Caravan Man—one act, ensemble cast, commissioned by the Williamstown Theatre Festival

Discography
AS GABRIEL KAHANE:

 2022 Magnificent Bird—Nonesuch Records
 2018 Book of Travelers—Nonesuch Records
 2014 The Ambassador—Sony Masterworks
 2011 Where are the Arms—StorySound Records
 2008 Gabriel Kahane—Family Records/Wasted Storefront
 2007 Walking Away from Winter (EP)—self-released
 2005 Five Songs (EP)—self-released

COMPILATIONS:

 2014 Red Hot + Bach—Sony Masterworks

SIDEMAN/ARRANGER:

 2012 Loudon Wainwright III: Older Than My Old Man Now—StorySound Records—(piano, arrangements)
 2010 Sufjan Stevens: The Age of Adz—Asthmatic Kitty—(string arrangements, background vocals)
 2010 Sufjan Stevens: All Delighted People—Asthmatic Kitty—(string arrangements, background vocals)
 2009 Loudon Wainwright III: High Wide & Handsome: The Charlie Poole Project—StorySound Records—(piano)
 2009 Dark Was the Night—Red Hot compilation released by 4AD—(piano cadenza)
 2009 Osso: Run Rabbit Run—Asthmatic Kitty—(arrangements)
 Brad Mehldau: Finding Gabriel

ORIGINAL CAST ALBUMS

 2012 February House—StorySound Records

COMPOSER:

 2013 yMusic: Year of the Dragon (Single)—Record Collection
 2013 Henning Kraggerud: Munch Suite—Simax Classics
 2012 Five Borough Songbook—GPR Records
 2011 yMusic: Beautiful Mechanical—New Amsterdam Records
 2011 Natasha Paremski: Brahms, Kahane, Prokofiev—Arioso Classics

References

External links

 Kahane's official website, at which his songs can be found.
 IMG Artist Profile
 Brooklyn Vegan Review
 Blog Profile on Gabriel Kahane
 Kahane's publisher, at which his music can be purchased or rented.

1981 births
Living people
20th-century American Jews
Brown University alumni
American male composers
American male singer-songwriters
American singer-songwriters
American rock singers
American rock songwriters
American musical theatre composers
21st-century American singers
21st-century American male singers
21st-century American Jews